Ward No. 1 Dhaka South City Corporation is an administrative division of Dhaka South City Corporation in zone 1, which formally known as ward no. 24 of Dhaka City Corporation. It's located in Khilgaon police station of Dhaka City. It forms a city corporation council electoral constituency and is a part of Bangladesh Jatiyo Sangshad constituency Dhaka-9.

Overview 
The ward covers Block A and Block B under Khilgaon Police Station in Dhaka. The boundaries of the ward are Goran in the east, Malibagh in the west, Taltola in the north and Bashabo in the south.

Election highlights

References

External links 
 Official website

Wards of Dhaka South City Corporation